Jana Novotná and Arantxa Sánchez Vicario were the defending champions but only Novotná competed that year with Mary Joe Fernández.

Fernández and Novotná won in the final 6–4, 6–0 against Lori McNeil and Larisa Neiland.

Seeds
Champion seeds are indicated in bold text while text in italics indicates the round in which those seeds were eliminated. The top four seeded teams received byes into the second round.

Draw

Final

Top half

Bottom half

External links
 1995 Delray Beach Winter Championships Doubles draw

Virginia Slims of Florida
1995 WTA Tour